Alan Turing (1912–1954) was a British mathematician, logician, cryptanalyst and computer scientist.

Turing may also refer to:
Turing Award, the annual award given by the Association for Computing Machinery for contributions to the computing community
Turing (cipher), a cryptographic stream cipher
Turing (programming language), a Pascal-based programming language used in teaching computer science
Turing (microarchitecture), an Nvidia graphics chip microarchitecture featuring artificial intelligence and real-time ray tracing
Angelica Turing, a Sense8 character
Turing baronets, a title in the Baronetage of Nova Scotia
Sir John Dermot Turing (born 1961), a British solicitor and author
Turing Center, a research center at the University of Washington
Turing Institute, an Artificial Intelligence laboratory based in Glasgow, Scotland between 1983 and 1994
Turing test, a test developed by Alan Turing of a machine's ability to exhibit the intelligent behavior of a human

Turing, the sapient machine lead character from 2064: Read Only Memories (video game)
Turing (drag queen), Filipino drag queen

See also
List of things named after Alan Turing
Turing test (disambiguation)